The 2013 Investec Cup was a women's field hockey tournament held at Hartleyvale Stadium. It took place between 4–10 February 2013 in Cape Town, South Africa. A total of four teams competed for the title.

The Netherlands won the tournament by defeating South Africa 4–2 in the final. England won the bronze medal by defeating Australia 3–2 in a penalty shoot-out following a 2–2 draw.

Participating nations
A total of four teams competed for the title:

Results

Pool matches

Classification matches

Semi-finals

Third and fourth place

Final

Statistics

Final standings

Goalscorers
7 Goals
 Maartje Paumen
4 Goals
 Pietie Coetzee
2 Goals

 Casey Eastham
 Anna Flanagan
 Georgia Nanscawen
 Sophie Bray
 Roos Drost
 Kitty van Male
 Marsha Marescia
 Jade Mayne

1 Goal

 Fiona Boyce
 Kirstin Johnson
 Jodie Schulz
 Susie Gilbert
 Dilly Newton
 Nicola White
 Ellen Hoog
 Kelly Jonker
 Ireen van den Assem
 Charlotte Vega
 Maria Verschoor
 Tarryn Bright
 Lisa-Marie Deetlefs

References

Women's Hockey Investec Cup
Investec Cup
International women's field hockey competitions hosted by South Africa
hockey
Hockey Investec Cup
Sports competitions in Cape Town
2010s in Cape Town